The Phoenix Tribune was the first African American newspaper in Arizona. Founded in 1918 by Arthur Randolph Smith, he was the main editor of the magazine until it folded in 1931.

Media coverage
Arizona newspapers covered the launch of the Tribune and local paper Arizona Republican supported it, and subscription advertisements for the Phoenix Tribune appeared in the Republican.

Paper mottos
"We originate – others imitate"
"Always improving"
"Arizona's Greatest Weekly" 
"Arizona's Leading Newspaper...Key to Happiness in 10,000 Homes"

History

The Tribune advertised and promoted the local African American community and African American-owned businesses. It appealed to its readers to patronize companies that "spend your money where you are welcome." The Tribune published domestic, national and international news, and reported civil rights issues including the effects of World War I and racism. Newspapers began with weekly magazines and were 4 to 10 pages long. The special edition was over 12 pages with over 30 pages full of advertisements. The paper was published weekly until 1923, when the newspaper appeared first only once every two weeks, then once a month, and finally only once every few months, until it did not appear in 1931.

Bibliography 
Notes

References 

Newspapers published in Arizona
Phoenix metropolitan area
Freedom Communications
Publications established in 1918
1918 establishments in Arizona Territory
Defunct newspapers published in Arizona